The Downtown Rock Springs Historic District is a  historic district that was listed on the National Register of Historic Places in 1994.  It is roughly bounded by K, 4th, C, 2nd, A, and 5th Streets in downtown Rock Springs, Wyoming.

The district was site of the 1885 Chinese Massacre.

It included 27 contributing buildings and 18 non-contributing buildings.  Two properties were already separately-listed on the National Register.

Contributing buildings include:
Park Hotel (1914–15), 19 Elk Street, designed by D.D. Spani
First National Bank Building, now known as First Security Bank, separately listed on the NRHP
City Hall, separately listed on the NRHP

See also 
 List of National Historic Landmarks in Wyoming
 National Register of Historic Places listings in Wyoming

References

External links
 Downtown Rock Springs Historic District at the Wyoming State Historic Preservation Office

Art Deco architecture in Wyoming
Neoclassical architecture in Wyoming
Geography of Sweetwater County, Wyoming
Victorian architecture in Wyoming
Historic districts on the National Register of Historic Places in Wyoming
National Register of Historic Places in Sweetwater County, Wyoming